The Hill is an inner city, residential suburb of Newcastle, in the Hunter Region of New South Wales, Australia, located immediately south of Newcastle's central business district. The Hill is filled with historic Victorian terraces and is the site of a historic convict prison block.
As of January 2021, the average house price in The Hill was A$1.92m.

History 
The Aboriginal people, in this area, the Awabakal, were the previous people of this land. The Hill was first known as Church Hill then Prospect Hill. It was one of the earliest settled areas of Newcastle and the site of the first town plan laid out by Henry Dangar in 1823. The first railway was located there, starting at AA Coy's A Pit just off Church Street

The Boltons 
The site was originally used as a mine with two engines creating coal fired stream. A series of four homes in San Francisco style. They are timber houses designed by Frederick B Menkins and built by G.W Brewer in 1904. Each house has 4 bedrooms and bathroom is the last selling for $1,725,00.

Heritage listings
The Hill has a number of heritage-listed sites, including:
 51 Brown Street: Newcastle Reservoirs
 51 Church Street: Woodlands
 52a Church Street: Christ Church Cathedral
 52a Church Street: Horbury Hunt Hall

Gallery

Notes

  Area calculation is based on 1:100000 map 9232 NEWCASTLE.

References

 
Suburbs of Newcastle, New South Wales